S100 calcium-binding protein A8 (S100A8) is a protein that in humans is encoded by the S100A8 gene. It is also known as calgranulin A.

The proteins S100A8 and S100A9 form a heterodimer called calprotectin.

The protein encoded by this gene is a member of the S100 family of proteins containing 2 EF-hand calcium-binding motifs. S100 proteins are localized in the cytoplasm and/or nucleus of a wide range of cells, and involved in the regulation of a number of cellular processes such as cell cycle progression and differentiation. S100 genes include at least 13 members which are located as a cluster on chromosome 1q21. This protein may function in the inhibition of casein kinase and as a cytokine. Altered expression of this protein is associated with the disease cystic fibrosis  and post COVID-19 condition.

References

Further reading 

 
 
 
 
 
 
 
 
 
 
 
 
 
 
 
 
 
 

S100 proteins